The men's javelin throw event at the 1986 Commonwealth Games was held on 2 August at the Meadowbank Stadium in Edinburgh. This was the first edition using the new model javelin.

Results

References

Athletics at the 1986 Commonwealth Games
1986